The Ambassador's Wife is a 1955 West German spy film directed by Hans Deppe and starring Paul Hubschmid, Ingrid Andree and Antje Weisgerber.

It was shot at the Spandau Studios in West Berlin and on location around Lisbon. The film's sets were designed by the art directors Willi Herrmann and Heinrich Weidemann.

Cast
 Paul Hubschmid as John de la Croix
 Ingrid Andree as Andrea Lundvall
 Antje Weisgerber as Subylle Costa
 Hans Stüwe as Christian Lundvall
 Laya Raki as Manuela
 Charles Regnier as Mattusch
 Hans Quest as Holmgreen
 Kurt Vespermann as Nilsson
 Alice Treff as Charlotte Hendrik
 Herbert Hübner as Paul de la Croix
 Sandra Mammis as Juana
 Hans Deppe
 Wolf Harnisch

References

Bibliography 
 Parish, James Robert. Film Actors Guide. Scarecrow Press, 1977.

External links 
 

1955 films
1950s spy drama films
German spy drama films
West German films
1950s German-language films
Films directed by Hans Deppe
Films set in Lisbon
Films shot in Lisbon
Films shot at Spandau Studios
1955 drama films
Constantin Film films
German black-and-white films
1950s German films